Gilbert Holmes (1772-1846) was a clergyman in the Church of Ireland during the late 18th century and the first four decades of the nineteenth.

Holmes was educated at Trinity College Dublin. He was Dean of Ardfert from 1802 to 1842   He died at Kilmore, County Tipperary on 23 December 1846.

References

Deans of Ardfert
Alumni of Trinity College Dublin
1772 births
1846 deaths